Kirthi Jayakumar (born 15 December 1987) is a peace educator, a women, peace, and security and feminist foreign policy practitioner, lawyer and writer. She is a Commonwealth Scholar, a Vital Voices (VV) Lead Fellow, a VV Engage Fellow, a Local Pathways Fellow, and a World Pulse Impact Leader. Kirthi is also a Fellow of the Royal Society of Arts. She served as an advisor to the G7 through the Women7 under the German Presidency of the G7 in 2022, and currently under the Japanese Presidency of the G7 in 2023, and was named as one of UN Women Asia Pacific's 30 for 2030. 

She also founded The Gender Security Project, an initiative working at the cross section of gender, peace, security, feminist foreign policy, and transitional justice through research, reportage, and documentation. Previously, she founded The Red Elephant Foundation, an initiative built on storytelling, civilian peace-building and activism for gender equality.

Biography
Kirthi was born as Kirthi Jayakumar in Bangalore, India, to Hindu parents. She studied law at the School of Excellence in Law, Chennai, Tamil Nadu.

She earned her MA in Peace Studies and Conflict Resolution from the UN-mandated University for Peace in Costa Rica, and an MA in Peace and Conflict Studies from the Centre for Trust, Peace, and Security at Coventry University, on a Commonwealth Scholarship. She has worked as a UN online volunteer.

Gender-based violence advocacy and peace activism
Kirthi is an activist on women's rights issues and peace and conflict. She formerly ran The Red Elephant Foundation. Currently, she runs The Gender Security Project. She has worked in voluntary capacities with "16 civil societies and UN agencies" through the UN Online Volunteering program. She is a columnist for the Deccan Chronicle/Asian Age.

Kirthi is a Global Youth Ambassador with A World at School run by Sarah Brown.

Kirthi coded and created Saahas, a mobile app that supports survivors of gender-based violence world over to find support, and that facilitates active bystander intervention. Saahas was listed on the Global Innovation Exchange. The app received recognition from DEF India under the SM4E Awards. For her work with Saahas, Kirthi was listed on the shortlist for the WATC 100 Women in Tech List. Saahas supports access to information and helplines through a mobile app, Facebook Chatbot, and Telegram Chatbot.

She produced two e-Books on entrepreneurship in Africa with the AAE and headed a team that worked for the opening of the first ever school in Okoijorogu, Nigeria, a village that had never had a school for its children until 2013.

Artist
Kirthi is an artist, working on pen and ink to curate "Zen doodles." She uses doodling as a means to express her activism for gender equality and peace education.

She used to run an Instagram-based project called Femcyclopaedia where she doodles portraits of inspiring women through the ages and from across the world and curates their stories under these portraits. The story of Femcyclopaedia won a Story Award from World Pulse in February 2017. Kirthi curated an exhibit for International Women's Day and Women's History Month at the US Consulate General in Chennai as part of Femcyclopaedia.

In 2021, Kirthi set up an Instagram-based art project called A Girl and A Galaxy where she dabbles in Astronomical Art.

Writer
Stories of Hope is Kirthi's first solo book, comprising a collection of short stories. She co-authored a book titled Love Me Mama: The Unfavoured Child, along with Elsie Ijorogu-Reed, the founder of Delta Women NGO. She is also the author of The Dove's Lament, published by Readomania. The book was nominated for the Muse India Young Author's Award in 2015. A review by Femina of The Dove's Lament suggests that, "Kirthi embroiders a tapestry of unvanquished human spirit in words."

The Times of India reviewed The Dove's Lament, with its critic opining that "...The Dove's Lament takes the reader to several such places with a compassion that shakes you to your very core."

Theatre
Kirthi wrote a play, Frankly Speaking, which, essentially starts off from where The Diary of Anne Frank ends. The play channels the voices of eight young women from conflict zones in different parts of the world, and is interspersed with passages from The Diary of Anne Frank.

She also wrote and acted in HerStory, which brings twelve women from history alive through poetry, performed through contemporary dance in sync with spoken word poetry. Kirthi wrote a monologue and performed it as part of Dolls, by Crea-Shakthi.

Kirthi also lent her voice to the audiobook version of "Like A Girl" by Aparna Jain, where she narrated the stories of Justice Leila Seth, Mayawati, Jayalalithaa, Dipa Karmakar, Shah Bano Begum, Tessy Thomas, and Gauri Sawant.

Public speaking
In October 2016, Kirthi delivered a TEDx Talk at TEDxChennai, addressing her work around peace education as a solution to end bullying. In November 2017, she delivered a TEDx Talk at TEDxChoice, addressing her art project, Femcyclopaedia.

In November 2016, she delivered a talk at the National Edu-Start Up Conference in Pune, talking about Peace Education as a sustainable solution to create well rounded citizens.

Kirthi was a speaker at Lakshya-SSN's annual event, SYCON, speaking about her work with The Red Elephant Foundation and the curation of the GBV Help Map. She was the keynote speaker at SRM Aarambh, speaking about her story as a social entrepreneur in the Gender Equality space.

In April 2017, Kirthi addressed the Rotary Club of Madras South on the topic "Women's Empowerment: Myths and Realities." She spoke at the Economic Times Women's Summit in March 2018, on her work with her app, Saahas.

Kirthi was a speaker at ISFiT 2019 alongside Tawakkol Karman and Gro Harlem Brundtland, addressing women and peacebuilding. In March 2021, Kirthi spoke at a special session convened by the President of the UN General Assembly on Political Leadership and Violence Against Women and Girls: Prevention First (23 March 2021).

Awards and recognition
Kirthi is the recipient of the United States Presidential Service Award from US Consul General Jennifer McIntyre. She won the Gold, Silver and Bronze awards. She received two United Nations Online Volunteering Awards, in 2012 and 2013, for her work with Delta Women and the Association for African Entrepreneurs.

In 2015, Kirthi was nominated for the Digital Women Awards 2015, presented by She The People TV.

In March 2016, she was one of the EU top 200 Women in the World of Development Wall of Fame. She was also one of the nominated changemakers for the United State of Women 2016. She is a two-time story award winner with World Pulse, and her work has been picked up and published by Time Magazine.

Kirthi has been acknowledged by India Today as one of the "Game changers" in the city of Chennai, "who are transforming the city with inspiring thought and hard work."

She was the youngest speaker to address a gathering at FICCI FLO, Chennai.

In September 2016, Kirthi was a shortlistee for the Rising Stars Award 2016 by We are the City India, which she went onto win. In October 2016, she was recognized as one of the "52 Feminists" by 52Feminists.com.

In October 2016, Kirthi was recognized as a Burgundy Achiever at the Digital Women Awards 2016, presented by She The People TV.
She received the Peace Award from the Global Peace Initiative in November 2016. She was selected as an Impact Leader at World Pulse in November 2016. She won the Orange Flower Award for Video Blogging, awarded by Women's Web. Kirthi was featured in Sarah Brown's Better Angels Podcast alongside UN Secretary General Antonio Guterres, Harriet Lamb, and Jakaya Kikwete.

Kirthi was featured on Google's WomenWill Landing page on International Women's Day, 2017, as part of a five-women-stories feature by World Pulse. She was declared as one of "eleven of India's feminist bloggers who are making a difference to women's lives" by Women's Web. She was featured on Show of Force: Social Good. She was awarded Outstanding Social Entrepreneur (NGO) of the Year, by FICCI FLO Chennai (2018) Kirthi received the Heroes of Chennai Award in the Social Good category in November 2018. She also served as a member of the youth council as part of the Global Business Coalition for Education (GBC-Education). She was nominated for the Better India's COVID Soldiers award in September 2020, and the We are the City TechWomen100 Awards for Global Achievement. She was also listed as one of the 100 Most Influential People in Gender Policy in 2021 by Apolitical.

List of awards received
 US Presidential Services Medal (Gold, Silver and Bronze) 2011–2012
 UN Online Volunteer of the Year Award (Delta Women) 2012
 UN Online Volunteer of the Year Award (Association of African Entrepreneurs) 2012
 UN Online Volunteer of the Year Award (Delta Women) 2013
 UN Online Volunteer of the Year Award (Association of African Entrepreneurs) 2013
 Finalist, Muse India Young Author's Award in 2015.
 Rising Stars of India Award (We Are The City India) 2016
 The Peace Award (Global Peace Initiative) 2016
 Orange Flower Award for Video Blogging, Orange Flower Awards, (Women's Web), 2016
Local Pathways Fellow (UN SDSN), 2017 
 Social Entrepreneur of the Year, 2017 (Brew Magazine)
 Young Achiever (Entrepreneurship) MOP Yuva Samman (2017–2018)
 Outstanding Social Entrepreneur (NGO) of the Year, FICCI FLO Chennai (2018)
 Nominee, True Honour Awards, 2018
 Outstanding Woman Achiever Award 2018, FICCI FLO, Jaipur (2018)
Vital Voices VV Engage Fellow (2018)
Heroes of Chennai – Social Good (Rising) (2018)
HerStory Woman on a Mission Award (March 2019)
Web Wonder Woman (Ministry of Women and Child Development, Twitter India and Breakthrough India) (March 2019)
CII-IWN Award for Unsung Heroes, March 2019
Best Feminist Voice, The Lifestyle Journal Awards, August 2019
The TIAW World of a Difference Award, October 2020
The World Pulse Spirit Award (Champion), February 2021
UN Women: 30 for 2030

Writing

Books

 Game Changers: Untold Stories Of Indian Feminists From The Past And The Present (Hay House India, 2020)
 The Doodler of Dimashq (Readomania, 2017)
 The Dove's Lament (Readomania, 2015)
 Stories of Hope (Maitreya, 2013)

Chapters

 Mother of the Nations (Demeter Press, Contributor, 2015)
Routledge Handbook of South Asian Criminology (Routledge, Contributor, 2019)

See also
 List of peace activists

References

Living people
1987 births
Indian feminists
Indian women's rights activists
Indian women novelists
Indian women activists
Activists from Karnataka
21st-century Indian lawyers
21st-century Indian women lawyers
21st-century Indian women writers
21st-century Indian novelists
Indian social entrepreneurs
Indian human rights activists
Indian women political writers
Feminist bloggers
Feminist artists
Businesswomen from Karnataka
Businesspeople from Bangalore
21st-century Indian businesswomen
21st-century Indian businesspeople
Indian women bloggers
Indian bloggers
Pacifist feminists